Stefan Paweł Rowecki (pseudonym: Grot, "Spearhead", hence the alternate name, Stefan Grot-Rowecki; 25 December 1895 – 2 August 1944) was a Polish general, journalist and the leader of the Armia Krajowa. He was murdered by the Gestapo in prison on the personal order of Heinrich Himmler.

Life

Rowecki was born in Piotrków Trybunalski. In his home town he was one of the organizers of a secret scouting organization. During World War I he was conscripted into the Austro-Hungarian army and later into the First Brigade of the Polish Legion. He was interned in August 1917 after the majority of his unit had refused to pledge loyalty to the Emperor of Austria. In February 1918, he was released from the internment camp in Beniaminów and joined the Polska Siła Zbrojna. After the establishment of the newly independent Poland, he joined the Polish Army.

Rowecki fought in the Polish–Soviet war (1919–1920). After the war, he remained in the army and organized the first military weekly periodical (Przegląd Wojskowy). From 1930 to 1935, he commanded the 55th Infantry Regiment in Leszno.

World War II

From June 1939, Rowecki organised the Warsaw Armoured Motorized Brigade (Warszawska Brygada Pancerno-Motorowa, 7TP, TKS tanks). On 1 September 1939 the Nazi-German Army invaded Poland. Although Rowecki's unit did not reach full mobilization, it did, however, take part in the defense of Poland.

After the Polish defeat, Rowecki managed to avoid capture and returned to Warsaw. In October 1939, he became one of the leaders, then in 1940 commander, of the Union of Armed Struggle (ZWZ). In 1941, Rowecki organized sabotage in the territories east of the Polish pre-war borders Wachlarz. From 1942, he was commander of the Armia Krajowa (Home Army).

As commander of the Home Army, Rowecki instituted policies favorable to Jews. In February 1943, he ordered the Home Army to help the Jewish underground seeking to mount ghetto uprisings. In particular, Rowecki authorized aid to the Jewish underground in the Warsaw Ghetto before and during the Warsaw Ghetto Uprising by providing arms and mounting diversionary attacks.

On 30 June 1943 he was arrested by the Gestapo in Warsaw and sent to Berlin.  Rowecki was arrested due to his betrayal by Ludwik Kalkstein "Hanka", Eugeniusz Świerczewski "Genes" and Blanka Kaczorowska "Sroka" who were Gestapo agents. All of them were members of the Home Army but in fact collaborated with the Gestapo. Swierczewski, Kalkstein and Kaczorowska were sentenced to death for high treason by the Secret War Tribunal of the Polish Secret State. The sentence on Eugeniusz Swierczewski was carried out by troops commanded by Stefan Rys ("Jozef"). Swierczewski was hanged in the basement of the house at 74 Krochmalna Street in Warsaw. Kalkstein received protection from the Gestapo and was not harmed. He fought in a Waffen SS unit during the Warsaw Uprising of 1944 under the name of Konrad Stark. After the war, he worked for the Polish Radio station in Szczecin and was later recruited as an agent by the Urząd Bezpieczeństwa. In 1982, he emigrated to France; he died in 1994. Blanka Kaczorowska also survived the war. Her death sentence was not carried out because she was pregnant. After the war, she also worked as a secret agent for the Urząd Bezpieczeństwa and later for the renamed Służba Bezpieczeństwa. She emigrated to France in 1971. She died in 2002

In Berlin he was imprisoned at Oranienburg and was questioned by many prominent Nazi officials (including Ernst Kaltenbrunner, Heinrich Himmler and Heinrich Müller). He was offered an anti-bolshevik alliance, but refused. He was probably executed in August 1944 in Sachsenhausen.  His execution was ordered by Heinrich Himmler.

There have been claims that the arrest of Rowecki on 30 June 1943 was a result of a wider intelligence operation against the Polish Underground State with the goal of eliminating top commanders and political leaders of the Polish resistance. During the same period, the Gestapo arrested the commander of National Armed Forces (NSZ), Colonel Ignacy Oziewicz on 9 June 1943. On 4 July 1943, General Władysław Sikorski died in a plane crash under mysterious circumstances. Within a period of two months, the Polish Army had lost three top commanders.

Medals
 Order of the White Eagle, posthumously (11 November 1995)
 Virtuti Militari Golden Cross (1942; Silver Cross in 1923)
 Polonia Restituta, Officer's Cross
 Cross of Valour 8 times, 4 times for Polish-Soviet War and 4 times for Polish Defensive War of 1939
 Gold Cross of Merit twice
 Cross of Independence with Swords
 Medal Pamiątkowy za Wojnę 1918-1921
 Medal 10-lecia Odzyskania Niepodległości
 Armia Krajowa Cross, posthumously (1967)
 Star of Perseverance (Gwiazda Wytrwałości, posthumously)
 Legion of Merit Commander, posthumously by Ronald Reagan (USA 9 August 1984)
 Légion d'honneur, Officer's Cross (France 1937)

See also

General Stefan "Grot" Rowecki Bridge - a bridge named after him in Warsaw
FB MSBS Grot - a Polish modular assault rifle named after his WW2 pseudonym

References

1895 births
1944 deaths
People from Piotrków Trybunalski
People from Piotrków Governorate
20th-century Polish people
Austro-Hungarian military personnel of World War I
Polish people of World War I
Polish legionnaires (World War I)
Polnische Wehrmacht personnel
Polish generals
Polish Rifle Squads members
Home Army members
Officiers of the Légion d'honneur
Polish Scouts and Guides
Military personnel who died in Nazi concentration camps
Officers of the Order of Polonia Restituta
Recipients of the Gold Cross of the Virtuti Militari
Recipients of the Cross of Independence with Swords
People who died in Sachsenhausen concentration camp
Recipients of the Cross of Valour (Poland)
Recipients of the Gold Cross of Merit (Poland)
Recipients of the Armia Krajowa Cross
Commanders of the Legion of Merit
Polish people of the Polish–Soviet War
Polish military personnel killed in World War II
Executed military leaders
Polish people executed in Nazi concentration camps
Executed people from Łódź Voivodeship
20th-century Polish journalists
Recipients of the Order of the White Eagle (Poland)